Myotrophin is a protein that in humans is encoded by the MTPN gene.

Interactions
MTPN has been shown to interact with RELA and REL.

References

Further reading